Daven A. Anderson (born June 30, 1943) is an American oil and watercolor painter who is well known for his representational paintings, especially marine scenes.

Early life and career 
Anderson was born in Washington D.C. and was raised in Oak Park, Illinois. He attended the United States Naval Academy, Annapolis, Maryland earning a Bachelor's degree in Engineering, studied nuclear engineering while in the Navy, and served in the nuclear submarine navy. He earned an MBA from the University of Chicago. Anderson is a self-taught artist with paintings in various collections including the permanent collections of the Channel Islands Maritime Museum, the Maritime Museum of San Diego, Evansville Museum of Arts, History and Science, the Missouri Historical Society, the United States Naval Academy, the Rosemary Berkel and Henry L. Crisp II Museum, the Erie maritime Museum, the Kenosha Public Museum, the United States Coast Guard Art Museum and the St. Louis Mercantile Art Museum. Anderson taught watercolor for two years at the University of Missouri Saint Louis. In 2018, He has taught workshops in museums and for artists around the United States, on Celebrity and American cruises, and co-led a 16-day Plein air painting tour of China. Anderson is the current (since 2015) Executive Director of the Missouri Watercolor Society and the past (2014-2018) Managing Director of the American Society of Marine Artists.

Achievements 
Anderson has had seventeen museum exhibitions national and internationally. His series of 65 works in oil and watercolor: THE RIVERS: A Celebration of Life and Work on America’s Waterways was exhibited in seven United States museum exhibitions. A 144 page full color exhibition catalog supported the exhibitions. In March, 2017, Anderson received the prestigious Donald T. Wright Award, presented biennially by the Herman T. Pott National Inland Waterway Collection of the St. Louis Mercantile Library and Art Museum in recognition of a body of work that contributes significantly to a better understanding of the American inland waterways. Daven Anderson is a signature member of various art societies in the United States and a member of the St. Louis Artists Guild. Anderson’s work has been featured in various news magazines including the National Maritime Historical Society’s magazine, Sea History. He has been interviewed on the radio and on TV in both the United States and China.

References 

Living people
1943 births
20th-century American painters
People from Washington, D.C.
21st-century American painters